Man in the Mirror: The Michael Jackson Story is a 2004 Canadian-American biographical telefilm produced for VH1. It stars Flex Alexander as American pop star Michael Jackson, and follows his rise to fame and subsequent events. The film takes its title from one of Jackson's songs, "Man in the Mirror". The film was primarily shot in Calgary, Alberta, Canada, and was released August, 2004, a month prior to when Jackson's criminal trial was scheduled to begin.

Plot

Essentially a spiritual sequel to The Jacksons: An American Dream, which discussed the Jackson family as children, Man in the Mirror begins with a flashback, albeit with a voice-over narration by Michael Jackson (Flex Alexander), who reminisces on his younger self (played by Brennan Gademans in a non-speaking role), wanting a normal childhood. Young Michael is watching children play in the playground, wishing he could join in, but is ordered by his father to return to work. Later in 1983, following the release of his best selling album, Thriller, he becomes a global superstar and pop icon, which takes his career to a whole new level. Michael and his manager, Ziggy (based on Frank DiLeo) are chased by screaming fans to their limo, after Michael's performance at Motown 25: Yesterday, Today, Forever. Ziggy is impressed with the amount of record sales, while Michael says his life means more than money. Later that year, following the making of the Thriller music video, Michael is advised to put a disclaimer on the video, due to concerns about the video's themes, assuring audiences he "is not in league with the devil".

In 1984, Michael is seen reading his favourite book, Peter Pan to a terminally ill child with cancer, whose dying wish was to meet him. Michael tells the boy's mother that ″nobody dies, they just go home to be with God″. Michael lives in his family house with his parents; his kind, affectionate and understanding mother, Katherine, and his less affectionate, money driven and abusive father, Joe. When Joe books Michael and his brothers for a PepsiCo commercial, only Michael opposes the idea (considering he doesn't even drink Pepsi). Joe warns Michael not to disobey his orders, and as one of the Jacksons, Michael would be nothing without them. Michael reluctantly decides to do the commercial, convinced by his mother to do it for his brothers and for her. Prior to the shoot, he is visited by his doctor, Doctor Goodman and introduced to his assistant Debbie Rowe. Doctor Goodman tells Michael that if his skin disorder vitiligo worsens even further, he'll soon become allergic to sunlight. He is prescribed with medication to help with it. Michael wears a white glove to hide his skin problem. During the shoot, Michael's hair is accidentally set ablaze, severely burning his scalp, and is rushed to the hospital for treatment. His younger sister, Janet, visits him; the two appear to share a mutual love for Peter Pan, with Janet referring to Michael as Peter and Michael referring to her as Tink.

Later that year, Michael and his brothers embark on the Victory tour. On the final show of the tour in December, Michael announces on stage that he is going solo, shocking his brothers and infuriating his father.

Aged 30, Michael moves out of his parents' house, reverts from Jehovah's Witnesses to Christianity and moves to Sycamore Valley Ranch in Los Olivos, California which he renames Neverland, inspired by his fondness for Peter Pan. Michael redesigns Neverland, according to his aspirations, adding a theme park. Upon moving into his new home, Michael meets and befriends his maid's son (based on Jason Francia), who becomes the childhood best friend he never had. Michael begins to open Neverland to more children from around the world, inviting and nurturing for terminally ill children, including the cancer patient boy previously seen being read Peter Pan to at Michael's parents' house, who passes away after visiting, devastating Michael. He is left even more devastated when his maid quits and leaves Neverland, taking her son with her, thus separating the two and ending their friendship (the maid and her son in reality would later accuse Michael Jackson of child molestation and testify against him in court).

With his vitiligo condition worsening, Michael starts taking up plastic surgery, and a new look for his forthcoming Bad album. He later befriends a new little boy, Manny (based on Jordan Chandler). After releasing his eighth studio album, Dangerous in 1991, Ziggy confronts Michael, telling him spending a lot of money on children isn't benefitting his public image. Michael tells Ziggy he doesn't care about his image, but Ziggy argues otherwise, as the album Dangerous isn't charting successfully. Ziggy also tells Michael to stop living in a fantasy land and face reality. Reluctantly, Michael subsequently fires Ziggy, due to losing faith in him. Before embarking on his Dangerous World Tour in 1992, Michael visits Manny, telling him Steven Spielberg is making a Peter Pan film adaptation, and wants Michael to play Peter Pan. As Michael is about to leave Manny tells his father, Dr. Adam Thomas, that he and Michael have now had 30 sleepovers. The father asks Michael if he has read his screenplay which he wants Spielberg to consider for the Peter Pan film, but Michael says he hasn't had the time due to his promoting the album. Whilst Michael is on tour, news breaks that Manny and his father were accusing Michael of molesting him. Michael believes Manny's father is financially driven and is accusing him as revenge for not reading his screenplay and suggests giving it to Spielberg, hoping Dr. Thomas will drop the charges in return, but Michael's new manager, Bobby, tells him the Peter Pan movie has been cancelled (in reality, the Peter Pan adaptation was Hook, and the role of Peter Pan was instead given to Robin Williams, as Michael didn't like the idea of Spielberg's vision of an adult Peter Pan who had forgotten about his past). Michael insists the allegations are lies, telling his close friend, actress, Elizabeth Taylor that he "would never hurt a child" and "would slit [his] wrist" first. Elizabeth ensures Michael she knows he's innocent and concerned for his health, convinces him to cancel the rest of his tour and go to rehab. Michael is left feeling betrayed as he watches his sister La Toya in an interview on television, refusing to defend her brother and raising allegations of him bribing children's parents (she would later apologise for this, and claim she was groomed into saying it by former manager and husband, Jack Gordon). In an interview with the police, Manny confirms he initially slept on the floor and subsequently in Michael's bed. Manny stutters and gets emotional when coming out to the police with these allegations, feeling like he's betrayed Michael. After being photographed naked for investigation, Michael, feeling humiliated, suggests to his lawyer, Johnnie Cochran, that they settle out of the court. After settling with Manny's family for $25 million, Michael returns to Neverland where his fans welcome him back and show their love and support, believing the singer's innocence.

Bobby convinces Michael to start dating, and sets him up with Elvis Presley's daughter, Lisa Marie Presley, whom Michael previously met in a photoshoot in 1975, when she was seven years old. The two fall in love and are later married. The marriage makes the news, ranking next to the arrest of convicted murderer and former football legend, O. J. Simpson as the top story. Lisa moves to Neverland with her two children, Benjamin and Riley, to live with Michael, but Lisa later discovers that Michael seems to spend more time with children than his own wife and stepchildren, and that he seems to value his fans over his family. She and the children move back home. Michael tells Bobby she does not believe in Neverland, and that bringing her to live there was a mistake. In December 1995 whilst rehearsing for his comeback concert (set to premiere on HBO) in New York, Michael is rushed to hospital following a stress related panic attack. Lisa visits him in hospital and comforts him. Though she loves him, she reluctantly files for divorce, due to irreconcilable differences between the pair. Now living in New York, Michael is left heartbroken about being unable to have children of his own, but subsequently reencounters his doctor's assistant, Debbie Rowe, who agrees to have Michael's child, but has to marry him, due to Michael's religious beliefs against premarital sex. The two are married November 15, 1996, and Michael's son Michael Joseph "Prince" Jackson Jr., is born in February 1997, with daughter Paris-Michael Katherine Jackson following in April 1998. However, Debbie and Michael spend little time together outside of the hospital in which she gives birth to his children, as Michael focuses on his career.

In September 2001, Michael reunites with his brothers in a concert tour at Madison Square Garden to mark his 30th anniversary as a solo artist. With fear of 9/11, Michael, his children, and Bobby move back to Neverland. Prince Michael "Blanket" Jackson II is subsequently born in February, 2002. Michael is upset when hearing the public mock his child's name. Annoyed and disappointed with the public's perception of him as a father and family man, Michael agrees to do a documentary with ITV journalist Martin Bashir, hoping it will disprove and change people's views on him. Shooting begins May 2002. During their interview, Michael introduces Bashir to his friend, David (based on Gavin Arvizo), a 12-year-old cancer survivor. David tells Bashir that Michael is a child at heart. Michael tells Bashir that he has really grown to trust him, calling him a "very honest man".

Whilst in a hotel in Berlin, Germany, with his children, Michael shows Blanket to the fans gathered outside the hotel, by dangling the baby over the balcony. This causes controversy which upsets Michael who says he just wanted to show Blanket to the world. Bobby fears that this will further aggravate Michael's reputation, but Michael ensures that the documentary will change everything. However, he is left feeling betrayed by Bashir, upon the airing of the documentary "Living With Michael Jackson" in February 2003, where Michael is seen holding David's hand, and his words about sleeping with children have been taken out of context and misinterpreted. Michael is left feeling let down and realises that he cannot trust the media. He is later betrayed by David, who accuses Michael that same year of molesting him. Michael is subsequently charged with seven counts of child molestation, which could land him in prison for life if convicted.

In January 2004, Michael is greeted by his fans outside the courthouse who shower him with love and support. He greets them and sends his love, and promises that he will no longer give into fear and will not settle with or give money to his accusers and will fight all the charges once and for all. The film ends, stating: "Michael Jackson has denied all charges. His trial is scheduled to begin on September 13, 2004." (he would later be acquitted).

Cast

Award nominations
 2005 – Nominated NAACP Image Award Outstanding Actor in a Television Movie, Mini-Series or Dramatic Special – Flex Alexander.

Reception
The film originally aired on August 6, 2004, receiving a TV rating of TV-PG for language. The telefilm went on to receive generally negative reviews from both fans and critics alike as the film presented Jackson in a very unflattering manner and did not represent most of the true story. Unlike the former, none of Jackson's songs are heard, only mentioned in the telefilm.

Telelvision critic Melaine Mcfarland of the Seattle Post-Intelligencer called the "biopoem" (as described by the director) "one of those tastelessly timed works meant to coax forth any sympathy we might have for Jackson's situation".

Home media
It is available on DVD, where it is distributed by Paramount Home Entertainment and is rated PG-13 for some brief language and thematic elements by the MPAA.

References

External links
 
 
 Audio-description script

2004 television films
2004 films
Biographical films about Michael Jackson
2004 biographical drama films
2000s English-language films
American musical drama films
Films directed by Allan Moyle
Films shot in Calgary
American drama television films
2000s American films